Castle Gate is a ghost town in the western United States, located in Carbon County in eastern Utah. This formation features two sheer sandstone walls on either side of the Price River, which appear to open like a giant gate as travelers approach this narrow section of the canyon.

Coal mining origins
The first coal mine, named the Castle Gate Mine #1, opened around 1886, after the Denver and Rio Grande Western Railroad constructed its Utah Division over the Wasatch Plateau, from the town of Springville. The mine produced high-quality coal for the steam trains. Castle Gate Mine #2 opened in 1912, and was found to have the finest coal in the region. In 1914, Castle Gate was incorporated as a town, which was owned and tightly controlled by the Utah Fuel Company and the D&RGW; a third mine opened in 1922.

Historic events
The town is most famous for two historic events. On April 21, 1897, Butch Cassidy and Elzy Lay held up an employee of the Pleasant Valley Coal Company in a daylight robbery at the busy railroad station in Castle Gate, making off with $7,000 in gold.

On March 8, 1924, the Utah Fuel Company's Castle Gate Mine #2 exploded, killing 172 miners. Fatalities included 49 Greeks, 22 Italians, 8 Japanese, 7 English, 6 Austrians (Yugoslavs), 2 Scots, 1 Belgian, and 76 Americans, including 2 African-Americans. It was the third-deadliest disaster in the history of coal mining in the United States at that time, and remains the tenth deadliest at present.

Deconstruction of the town
Castle Gate was dismantled in the summer of 1974, and residents were relocated to a new subdivision at the mouth of Spring Canyon, west of Helper.  The former townsite was cleared and replaced with coal-loading facilities neighboring the railroad line.

See also

 List of ghost towns in Utah

References

External links

 

Ghost towns in Carbon County, Utah
Company towns in Utah
Coal towns in Utah
Mining communities in Utah
Denver and Rio Grande Western Railroad
Populated places established in 1886
Ghost towns in Utah
1886 establishments in Utah Territory
1974 disestablishments in Utah
Populated places disestablished in 1974